Eiders are large seaducks in the genus Somateria. The three extant species all breed in the cooler latitudes of the Northern Hemisphere.

The down feathers of eider ducks, and some other ducks and geese, are used to fill pillows and quilts—they have given the name to the type of quilt known as an eiderdown.

Taxonomy
The genus Somateria  was introduced in 1819 to accommodate the king eider by the English zoologist William Leach in an appendix to John Ross's account of his voyage to look for the Northwest Passage.  The name is derived from Ancient Greek  : sōma "body" (stem somat-) and  : erion "wool", referring to eiderdown.

Steller's eider (Polysticta stelleri) is in a different genus despite its name.

Species
The genus contains three species.

Two undescribed species are known from fossils, one from Middle Oligocene rocks in Kazakhstan and another from the Late Miocene or Early Pliocene of Lee Creek Mine, United States. The former may not actually belong in this genus.

References

External links 

 
Ducks